Lila Martinez (born July 10) also known as Lila Star Escada and known professionally as Lila Star is an American transgender actress, cosmetologist, recording artist, pageant competitor, and performer. She is known for being "the world's first transsexual Latina rapper."

Early life and education 
Lila Star was born as Lila Martinez in Chicago, Illinois. She lived in the Humboldt Park area until the age of eight when she moved to the Albany Park area, where she currently resides. She graduated from Roosevelt High School and attended Truman University. She also briefly attended The Second City.

Career 
Lila has been performing for many years as an illusionist at bars and nightclubs in Chicago's Boystown district. She is set cast at The Baton Show Lounge and Kit Kat Lounge and Supper Club, where she is known for her impersonations of: Lil' Kim, Jennifer Lopez, and Toni Braxton. In 2011 Lila made her debut on the rap music scene with the release of her hip-hop single, I'm a Killa. She has since self-released the singles The Truth and Feeling Like Cunt. In 2017 Lila appeared on the hip-house song, Cocky with Shea Coulee and The Vixen. The music-video for the song has since amassed over 3 million views on YouTube. On September 23, 2017 Lila's film debut in the neo-noir short film Lakeshore Drive was released for a one-time-only screening at The 400 Theater in Chicago. The movie is about a transsexual escort named Kim, played by Star, who is trying to escape prostitution and a controlling pimp behind. Lila says of her character Kim "I connected with the fact that the character wore sunglasses even at night because she was hiding something," said Star. "I was never comfortable in my own skin, so I would wear sunglasses even at night." Lila will complete her scenes for the 1970s period piece A History of Wise Men after funding is complete.

Discography

Singles

Featured appearances

Filmography

Television

References

External links 

21st-century American actresses
Actresses from Chicago
Hispanic and Latino American actresses
LGBT people from Illinois
Living people
Transgender actresses
Transgender singers
American LGBT singers
LGBT rappers
American women in electronic music
Year of birth missing (living people)
Spanish-language singers of the United States
Hispanic and Latino American women singers
Latin music songwriters
21st-century American women singers
American singer-songwriters
American women singer-songwriters
21st-century American singers
Transgender women musicians